Christopher Columbus High School is a public secondary school located in the Pelham Parkway section of the Bronx, New York City.  It is within walking distance from the Bronx Zoo and the New York Botanical Garden.

It currently enrolls over 2000 students in grades 9 through 12. The student body is diverse, with students whose families come from 66 countries.

Partnerships and special programs
Columbus High School has been a member of the Foundation for Excellent Schools since 1997.  It has a partnership with the University of Vermont, which offers special courses at Columbus.  JetBlue Airlines provides free transportation to faculty and students traveling between Vermont and the Bronx.

As of June 2004, Columbus High School was broken down into the Christopher Columbus Educational Campus and shared its premises with four, smaller, specialized schools:

Pelham Preparatory Academy
Global Enterprise Academy
Astor Collegiate High School
Collegiate Institute for Math and Science (Principal Estelle Hans)(CIMS)
As of 2016, Columbus High School is composed of five, smaller, specialized schools: 
 Collegiate Institute For Math and Science (CIMS)
 High School for Language and Innovation
 Bronxdale High School 
 Astor Collegiate Academy 
 Pelham Preparatory Academy 
The Bronx High School for the Visual Arts, originally the first small school to move into the campus, moved out at the end of the 2004 school year. It currently resides in the old Mercy College Bronx campus which it shares with one other small school.

Notable alumni
Robert Abrams (born 1938), Bronx Borough President, New York State Attorney General
Anne Bancroft (1931–2005), Oscar-winning actress
Evelyn Berezin (1925–2018), computer scientist and creator of the first word processor
David Berkowitz (born 1953), also known as the Son of Sam and .44 Caliber Killer, is an American serial killer.
Alexander Bickel (1924–1974), noted constitutional law scholar, Sterling Professor of Law, Yale Law School
Rudy De Luca, is an American screenwriter and actor best known for his work with filmmaker Mel Brooks.
Christine Jorgensen (1926–1989), was an American transgender woman who was the first person to become widely known for having sex reassignment surgery.
Jeffrey Klein (born 1960), member of the New York State Senate, Former Deputy Majority Leader, Assemblyman for the 80th District, and Democratic District Leader
Peter Levenda,  is an American author who focuses primarily on occult history.
Paul Levinson (born 1947), [1] is an American author, singer-songwriter, and professor of communications known for The O'Reilly Factor and other news venues
George Marino (1947–2012), was an American mastering engineer known for working on albums by rock bands starting in the late 1960s.
John McGiver (1913–1975), (former teacher at the school) actor on stage, film and television 1950s-70s.
Sal Mineo, (1939–1976) was an American actor, singer, and director. He is best known for his role as John "Plato" Crawford in the drama film ''Rebel Without a Cause and Exodus
Johnny Monell (born 1986) is an American former professional baseball catcher. He played in Major League Baseball for the Mets and San Francisco Giants. 
Izzy Molina (born 1971) is an American former professional baseball catcher for the Oakland Athletics and Baltimore Orioles.
Danielle Monaro, long-time co-host of Elvis Duran and the Morning Show
Tony Powers (born 1938), known as Tony Powers or Anthony Powers, is an American songwriter, recording artist, music video artist, and actor. 
Darlene Rodriguez (as Darlene Pomales) (born 1971), co-anchor, Today in New York, WNBC-TV
Neil Rosen (born 1956), is an Emmy award winning movie critic and entertainment journalist, NY1 News and PBS
Nancy Savoca (born 1959), is an American film director, producer, and screenwriter. Sundance Film Festival Grand Jury Award-winning film-maker
James Vacca, member of the New York City Council
Guy Velella (1944–2011), former New York State Senator and Bronx Republican Chairman

Teams

The Columbus Blue Steel won the Bronx Championships on November 3, 2006.  In 2006, Blue Steel had two All-City Players, a Linebacker and a Defensive End. The Columbus Explorers Varsity Tennis Team has acclaimed more importance in the last few years reaching the playoff 3 out of 4 years while The Girls' A-Division Varsity team reached the finals in the School year of 05'-06'. Also the track team won second place in 2007 in cross country, and that same year they won the Bronx indoor championship beating Clinton.

The boys' lacrosse team in 2010 won the PSAL championship, the first PSAL title Columbus had won. The boys' lacrosse team has also gone to back to back championship games in 2018+2019.

In 1960 the men's basketball team made the PSAL Finals, matching up with Boy's High for the Final game.

In men's Bowling, Columbus won the division championship three years in a row 95-97 and again in 2018 breaking a 22-year drought.

The girls' volleyball team was dominant in their division in the late 80s, early 90s under the coaching of Annette Leder.

Other Columbus teams include:

Girls' Teams: Soccer, Soft Ball, Basketball, Tennis, Track, Cheerleading, Step, Bowling, Gymnastics, Golf, Flag Football, Volleyball
Boys' Teams: Soccer, Baseball, Basketball, Tennis, Track, Bowling, Golf, J.V. Football, Varsity Football, Lacrosse, Volleyball

The soccer team also has been successful in winning divisions in 2008 and 2009 and is in the process of producing young players such as Martin Dadaj, Armand Dadaj, Alhousein Bah, Mamoudou Diallo, Malal Diallo, Mamadou Barry, Endri Berisha, Frank Osei and Michael Asante.

Threatened closure 
In December 2009, the New York City Department of Education announced plans to close Christopher Columbus High School, citing poor performance and low graduation rates. The department's plan called for phasing out the school and not enrolling new students in the ninth grade starting in the fall of 2010. Students, parents, and community activists criticized the department and fought to keep the school open. The Supreme Court in New York county later rejected the Department of Education's proposal on the grounds that there were procedural errors made.

References

NYC Department Of Education School Search 

Public high schools in the Bronx